Peak Island is one of the many uninhabited Canadian arctic islands in Qikiqtaaluk Region, Nunavut. It is a Baffin Island offshore island located in Frobisher Bay, southeast of Iqaluit. It is just east of the larger Culbertson Island. Other islands in the immediate vicinity include Low Island, Mark Island, McAllister Island, and Precipice Island.

References 

Islands of Baffin Island
Uninhabited islands of Qikiqtaaluk Region
Islands of Frobisher Bay